Farma (series 1) is the he first series of Farma, the Polish version of the reality television franchise The Farm. The series was announced in late 2021 to air on Polsat in early 2022. The first season of the show has 11 Poles live on a farm like it was 100 years ago for 6 weeks. They'll have to carry out tasks to earn prizes and luxury for the farm. The winner will receive 100,000 zł. The presenters of the show are Marcelina Zawadzka and Ilona Krawczyńska. The season premiered on 17 January 2022 on Polsat.

Finishing order
(ages stated are at time of contest)

The game

Weeks 1 to 5

Week 6

Voting history

Notes

:  Gosia joined the farm on Day 4. Because of that she was immune for the first week but was unable to vote. 
:  Tomasz as Farmer of the Week received immunity which he can use on himself, or give to someone else. He decided to give it to Kinga.
:  Contestants voted on who they wanted to save, instead of whom to evict.
: This week was a double eviction. Two contestants with the most votes were evicted, instead of one.
:  On Day 12 each team had to choose 1 member of the opposing team to a duel. The loser of the duel was automatically evicted.
:  Jakub Z. received immunity for winning the previous Duel.
: As the Green team has collected more coins in the weekly task, they received the ability to "Automatically Nominate" one member of the opposing team. They selected Izabela.
: Bartłomiej and Marlena as new contestants have been automatically nominated to a duel. They have been given a task to select themselves the opponents to a duel. Bartłomiej selected Rafał, while Marlena selected Kinga.
: On Day 20 Marlena has been Ejected from the Farm for refusing to participate in the Duel. Karol D as Farmer of the Week has nominated Monika as a replacement nominee.
: For the final week, there is no Farmer of the Week or Nomination Ceremony. Instead, all of the contestants participate in the daily challenges in which 2 contestants with the worst results get nominated.
:  Contestants competed as duets in the daily duel. After the duel hosts informed contestants that all teams at least once broke the rules of the challenge. Because of that, all farmers have been nominated.
:  For winning daily duel on day 28 Kuba W. automatically advanced to the finale, making him immune for Day 29.
: During the finale, the public voted for which finalist should win.

Notes

References

External links

The Farm (franchise)
Polish reality television series
2022 Polish television series debuts